Mount Erciyes, also known as Argaeus is an inactive volcano in Kayseri Province, Turkey. It is a large stratovolcano surrounded by many monogenetic vents and lava domes, and one maar. The bulk of the volcano is formed by lava flows of andesitic and dacitic composition. At some time in the past, part of the summit collapsed towards the east.

The volcano began to form in the Miocene. At first, a volcano farther east named  formed from lava flows. Then, again to the east, large explosive eruptions formed a caldera. During the Pleistocene, Mount Erciyes proper grew inside the caldera together with a group of lava domes. Lateral eruptions of Erciyes may have generated ash layers in the Black Sea and the Mediterranean during the early Holocene.

The last eruptions occurred during the early Holocene and may have deposited ash as far away as Palestine; the occurrence of historical volcanism is uncertain. Future eruptions of Erciyes may endanger the nearby cities to the north. The volcano was glaciated during the Pleistocene. One regular glacier still exists, but is receding.

Etymology 
Erciyes is the adoption into Turkish of the Greek name Argaios (Greek: Ἀργαίος). The latinized form is Argaeus (a rarely encountered alternative latinization was Argaeas mons, Argeas mons).
The Greek name has the meaning of  "bright" or "white"; 
as applied to the mountain, it may have been eponymous of  Argaeus I (678640BC), king of Macedon and founder of the Argead dynasty. 

The Turkish name was historically spelled Erciyas, and it was changed to Erciyes to conform with vowel harmony
in the 1940s-1960s.

Mons Argaeus on the Moon was named for Argaeus.

Geology and geomorphology 

Erciyes lies in the Kayseri Province of Turkey. The city of Kayseri lies - north of Erciyes volcano; some lava domes generated by the volcano are within the urban limits. Access to the summit area is difficult. Climbers in antiquity reported that both the Black Sea and the Mediterranean could be seen from the summit.

Regional 

Erciyes Dagi and Hasan Dagi are both large stratovolcanoes that lie in Central Anatolia, on the Turkish microplate. This microplate is part of the collision zone between the Eurasian Plate, the African Plate, and the Arabian Plate that forms the Alpide Belt. This convergence commenced in the Miocene and formed the Anatolian block, with two oceans that existed between these three plates in the Eocene disappearing through subduction. During the late Miocene, the Neo-Tethys ocean disappeared, and Africa and Eurasia collided. Later, the Red Sea and the Gulf of Suez separated the Arabian Plate from the African Plate, causing the former to collide with Eurasia and forming the Bitlis–Zagros Belt. The Anatolian block was pushed westward between the North Anatolian and East Anatolian faults, and it is still moving today.

In central Anatolia, volcanism commenced in the Miocene. After an effusive phase and the eruption of large ignimbrite sheets, volcanoes developed, including stratovolcanoes such as Erciyes Dagi and Hasan Dagi on the one hand and monogenetic volcanoes and maars on the other hand. The tectonic environment has been compared with the Basin and Range Province. The youngest K–Ar dates obtained on these centres are 60,000 ± 20,000 years ago for the Kizirtepe monogenetic centres and 20,000 ± 10,000 for Hasan. Volcanic activity in the Acıgöl-Nevşehir system has been fission track dated at 15,500 ± 2,500 years ago.

Major faults such as the North Anatolian Fault, which were generated by the convergence, are also active. These margin faults have been the source of earthquakes during historical times, resulting in damage to cities in the region, and ongoing extension of this crustal domain is the probable reason for volcanism at Erciyes.

Local 

It developed over a broad shield, and dacitic domes and flows form the bulk of the volcano's exposed units, including the summit area, where several lava flows have been identified. Lava flows of Erciyes extend both from the summit and from lateral vents. The volcano overall has an eroded appearance.

Two major valleys extend to the summit, the northwesterly Aksu Valley and the easterly  valley. A glacial outwash plain formed at the valley foot and was partly buried by  lavas. Moraines and outwash plains are heavily eroded.

This centre is mostly formed by lava flows. On the western side, andesitic lava flows reach the  basin. The huge middle Pleistocene Aliboran lava flow descended the western slopes and blocked the Incesu valley, forming Aliboran Lake in the basin. This overflow was not continuous; phases of lower lake levels caused it to dry up. Today, the basin contains wetlands that are protected under the Ramsar Convention and are a major nesting site for migratory birds.

Endogenous domes extend from Erciyes, and 184, 210, or 64 individual centres dot its flanks. It formed within Quaternary andesite lava flows; its formation was probably favoured by a shallow aquifer and was accompanied by strong phreatomagmatic explosions.

From the more recent volcanic phases,  and  lava domes lie on the southern and northern slope of Erciyes, respectively.

The volcano lies in a tectonic depression. It is cut by the  fault, which together with the  fault border this basin. Other faults converge on the volcano or pass through its outer slopes. Aeromagnetic investigation of the region has evidenced the existence of a magnetic anomaly associated with Erciyes, which is probably caused by the volcanism.

Petrology 

Erciyes Dagi has erupted basalt, basaltic andesite, andesite, dacite, rhyodacite, and rhyolite. The rocks are chiefly andesite with smaller amounts of dacite; dacites appear to dominate in the summit region, however. The volcano is dominated by calc-alkaline rocks; one basalt with tholeiitic to intermediary affinity was erupted 1.7million years ago; volcanic activity at first was tholeiitic and later became calc-alkaline. Monogenetic volcanoes in the region also erupted basalt, but this basalt is clearly different from the Erciyes basalt.

Minerals contained in Erciyes rocks include clinopyroxene, ilmenite, orthopyroxene, plagioclase, and titanomagnetite. Samples taken from the summit also contain amphibole, apatite, biotite, feldspar, quartz, and zircon. The mineral  was first described from samples obtained on Mount Erciyes, and its chemical formula is ·.

The andesites and dacites may have formed from basaltic magma by fractional crystallization involving amphibole, based on elemental composition data. Further, crustal materials were included into the magma. Tholeiitic and calc-alkaline magmas have different elemental compositions and probably formed from separate sources; tholeiitic magmas may have formed from partial melting of the mantle, while the calc-alkaline magmas formed from crustal assimilation in these magmas. Overall, the magma originated in the asthenospheric mantle; lithospheric components may have contributed, however.

Volcanism appears to be associated with crustal extension at Erciyes. Mantle metasomatism from a subducting slab, on the other hand, may or may not have played a major role, and the slab itself did not reach down below Central Anatolia, meaning that subduction probably is not responsible for Central Anatolian volcanism.

Climate and biology 

The climate of the region is influenced by topography, with the Taurus and Kaçkar Mountains blocking the entry of moisture into Anatolia. During the last glacial maximum, precipitation may have been double that of present-day.

Four vegetation belts surround the mountain: a boreal belt, a subalpine, an alpine, and a subnival belt. Species found in the vegetation belts are different from these found in the equivalent areas of Western European mountains.

The flora of Erciyes is diverse. A number of endemic plant species have been identified, including Astragalus argaeus, Astragalus stenosemioides, Asyneuma trichostegium, Bellardiochloa argaea, Dianthus crinitus argaeus, Festuca cratericola, Festuca woronowii argaea, Hieracium argaeum, Onobrychis argaea, and Vicia canescens argaea. The plant Silene erciyesdaghensis was discovered on Erciyes and named after it. The geographer Strabo claimed that, in antiquity, the volcano was forested. A number of endemic and relic animal species can also be found at Erciyes, as well as a rich lichen flora. Grazing, settlements, and tourism have altered the natural vegetation of the mountain.

Glaciation 

The volcano was glaciated during the Pleistocene, during which about three stages of glaciation occurred. Aretes, cirques, horns, and moraines from these glaciations can be found on the volcano, with each of the five valleys that extend from the summit hosting glaciers. The snowline was  lower during the last glacial maximum, probably due to a wetter climate. Chlorine-36 dating has yielded ages corresponding to the last glacial maximum and late glacial for the principal moraines in Aksu valley. Glacier retreat occurred 20,700 ± 2,200 - 20,400 ± 1,800 years ago in the two catchments. Smaller advances and retreats occurred 14,600 ± 1,200 and 9,300 ± 1,500 years ago. The glaciers expanded last 3,800 ± 400 years ago; there is no clear evidence of a Little Ice Age glacier expansion. Later glacial advances mostly correspond to these estimated for other Mediterranean glaciers. Meltwater from these glaciers nourished a now-gone lake in the  basin.

During antiquity, the summit was always covered with snow. This is the westernmost glacier in Turkey today; other glaciers are found in the Kaçkar Mountains at the Black Sea, Mount Cilo in southeastern Turkey, and on Ararat.

Eruptive history 

A number of potassium–argon dates have been obtained for Erciyes Dagi, ranging from 2.59 ± 0.1 million years ago to 80,000 ± 10,000 years ago. Some stratigraphic units from Erciyes have been dated. Early volcanic activity occurred at the same time as the initial formation of the Erciyes basin.

Overall,  was active between 4.4 and 2.9 million years ago.

Caldera-forming activity occurred in several eruption phases, accompanied by pumice flows and ash fall. At least fifteen individual layers have been found.

Eastern Cappadocia features the famous Cappadocian ignimbrites; one of these ignimbrites, the Valibaba Tepe ignimbrite (also known as ), was linked to Erciyes volcano and is the last Cappadocian ignimbrite. The Valibaba Tepe ignimbrite extends east of the Erciyes volcano; it originated there and filled in the previous topography. Changes in magma composition from the first phase of caldera-forming activity to the Valibaba Tepe pumice may reflect the emptying of a magma chamber with vertical composition gradient. The Valibaba Tepe ignimbrite was considered part of the famous Cappadocian ignimbrites, but is distinct from them insofar as the other ones (with the possible exception of the Taspinar-Dikmen ignimbrites of Hasan Dagi) are not associated with stratovolcanoes.

Erciyes volcano proper started developing 900,000 years ago. It was formed during two phases, starting with a basaltic andesite lava flow on the southern slope 1.7million years ago. It was followed by the andesitic lava flows on the western flank and then by many of the dacitic lava domes. Effusive activity ended with small lava flows of varying composition.

The last dacitic eruption occurred 80,000 ± 10,000 years ago at  although later research has discovered later lavic eruptions. Activity in the summit region probably ended before the Holocene.

Radiometric dating has yielded evidence of a major pulse of volcanic activity in the early Holocene. The three eruptions appear to have occurred within a short timeframe from each other. , a lava dome in Kayseri, is also of Holocene age, having been erupted 8,900 ± 400 years ago.

This eruption at first formed a tuff ring, within which the lava dome was emplaced.

The last event was the collapse of the eastern flank of Ercyies. This collapse was probably triggered by an earthquake, considering that no evidence for a concomitant eruption exists. Considering the ages of the oldest moraines contained within the collapse scar, it probably happened more than 25,000 years ago.

Other tephras identified in the Levantine Sea and erupted between 10,000 and 8,000 years ago may also come from Erciyes. The eruptions that formed all these layers probably had profound effects on the affected Mediterranean cultures. The tephra from these eruptions thus was probably spread northeastward, in contrast to the  eruption, which spread tephra southeastward and thus is not found in the Black Sea. The unusual southward transport of the tephra may have occurred through low altitude winds.

Andesites of less than 1,000 years of age have been identified. The occurrence of volcanic activity in historical times is not clear; Strabo (63 BC–21 AD) and Claudius Claudianus (370–410 AD) report volcanic activity, and Roman coins found in Cappadocia show the mountain smoking, but these reports may instead refer to swamp gas release in the  basin and Strabo's reports appear to refer to fires in swamps. If volcanic activity occurred during historical times, it probably occurred on a parasitic vent, as the principal cone is heavily eroded.

Threats and human interaction 

Erciyes Dagi volcano has manifested explosive eruptions preceding the formation of lava domes. Such eruptions may endanger the cities of Kayseri, Hacilar, and Talas. Melting of the remnant ice on the volcano may generate dangerous lahars; in 1985 an eruption of Nevado del Ruiz volcano in Colombia claimed 20,000 fatalities after such a mudflow. Even without an eruption, strong rainfall could form mudflows on the densely populated steep slopes of the volcano. The volcano is monitored with seismometers and its deformation has been measured.

The ancient Hittites left rock carvings and even an artificial tunnel on Mount Erciyes.

According to a vita of Saint Lazaros of Mount Galesios (11th century CE) written by his disciple Gregory the Cellarer, Lazaros climbed and descended Mount Erciyes in the depths of winter while singing the Psalms, as he encountered harsh weather and even a bear and attacking dogs.

At present, about five hotels exist at the mountain, which is a major winter sports site. In 2010, 324,221 tourists visited the mountain and Kayseri, most of them domestic tourists. A ski centre, Erciyes Ski Resort, exists on Erciyes.

Notes

References

Sources

External links 
 Ski Resort
 Global Volcanism Program page about Mount Erciyes

Landforms of Kayseri Province
Mountains of Turkey
Stratovolcanoes of Turkey
Ski areas and resorts in Turkey
Three-thousanders of Turkey
VEI-6 volcanoes
Calderas of Turkey
Miocene stratovolcanoes
Pliocene stratovolcanoes
Pleistocene stratovolcanoes
Holocene stratovolcanoes